The Parti durable du Québec (English: Sustainable Development Party) is a political party in Quebec that advocates for regionalism, centrism, and sustainable development.

According to Quebecpolitique.com, the party "was founded in 2008. Its mission is to "defend the interests of the regional population" of (the) Saguenay-Lac-Saint-Jean" region.

Election 2008
In the 2008 election, party leader Sebastien Girard ran as the party's only candidate in the provincial riding of Roberval. He finished in fifth place with 571 votes (2.1%), tying with the candidate for Québec Solidaire.

Dissolution
In February 2010, Quebec's Chief Electoral Officer released a statement saying that the party had lost its official status as an authorised political party as of November 2009.

Platform
On the party website, Girard laid out the party's platform:

La Charte du Bois (The Timber Charter):
Due to the crisis in the forestry sector in the Saguenay-Lac-Saint-Jean region, the party suggests that a Timber Charter be introduced in the National Assembly. This charter would contain two different agendas:
1. Wood products would be labelled, so that they can be traced, advocating local consumption of wood with a local origin.
2. More use of Quebec wood in the construction of public buildings in Quebec.
Entrepreneurship and Youth Migration
To combat migration and brain drain from the Saguenay region, the party promised:
A work-entrepreneurship program, in which entrepreneurs would spend part of the time working and the other part developing their idea or business plan.
A student-entrepreneurship program, which would give youth resources for their entrepreneurial ideas.
A regional mentoring program, to help foster the two above programs.
Energy policy
Investment in renewable energy sources, more specifically ethanol, biodiesel and methane
An energy cooperative for the Saugenay region.
Education
More investment in alternative forms of education.
More assessment of students and more resources for teachers
Food
The development of a "Charter of Agricultural Soils"
Developing a visibility program for regional products
Sustainable tourism
Investment in a sustainable tourist sector in the Saugenay region
Opening Internet access to all citizens in the region, opening tourist-based businesses to the world
Developing a tourist cooperative for the Saugenay-Lac-Saint-Jean region.
Invest in a circuit of hostels
Establishing festivals and activities for the Lac-Saint-Jean region.
Making tourist information available in different languages
Establishing a rail tour of the area
First Nations
Collaboration with the local Innu community to establish a research centre.
Promoting the education of Native Spirituality on reserves and encouraging discussion in public schools
Establishing an ethnotourist market in the region.
Sustainable environment
Regulate the burning of wood
Accelerate development of electric vehicles
Nationalize Quebec water
Health
Recognize and regulate alternative medicines
Give more power to graduate nurses
Relax admission to those looking at medical school

References

Provincial political parties in Quebec
Political parties established in 2008
Political parties disestablished in 2009